InterPlane Aircraft sro, also called InterPlane Aircraft, Inc., was a Czech aircraft manufacturer based in Zbraslavice and founded in 1992. The company specialized in the design and manufacture of ultralight aircraft in the form of kits for amateur construction and ready-to-fly aircraft in the US FAR 103 Ultralight Vehicles rules, the European Fédération Aéronautique Internationale microlight and the American light-sport aircraft categories.

The company was a Společnost s ručením omezeným (sro), a Czech private limited company, although the company referred to itself as InterPlane Aircraft, Inc..

In 2013 the company announced that it was seeking a buyer for the business and its hangar and facilities. By the end of that year the company seems to have gone out of business.

Products
The company's first design, introduced in 1992, was the InterPlane Griffon, a single-seat, strut-braced, high wing kit plane for the US FAR 103 Ultralight Vehicles category. The same year the company introduced the two seats in side-by-side configuration, strut-braced high wing InterPlane Skyboy, which was supplied only as a complete ready to fly aircraft. The Skyboy was accepted as a US light-sport aircraft and in Canada as an Advanced Ultralight Aeroplane.

The company also sold the InterPlane ZJ-Viera, a single seat, low wing, lightweight, low cost airplane made predominantly from composites. It was designed by Marek Ivanov, manufactured by Ivanov Aero and fit the US FAR 103 Ultralight Vehicles category. The company incorporated a  photo of the aircraft into its logo.

In the late 1990s the company proposed a low-wing metal and composite two seater to be called the InterPlane Starboy, but it appears to have not been flown.

Aircraft

References

External links

 - former location
Company website archives on Archive.org

Defunct aircraft manufacturers of the Czech Republic and Czechoslovakia
Ultralight aircraft
Homebuilt aircraft